Nowgong Girls' College, established in 1962, is a general degree girl's college situated in Nowgong, Assam. This college is affiliated with the Gauhati University.

Departments

Science
Mathematics
Statistics

Arts
 Assamese
 English
Sanskrit
History
Education
Economics
Political Science
Hindi
Geography

References

External links

Universities and colleges in Assam
Colleges affiliated to Gauhati University
Educational institutions established in 1962
1962 establishments in Assam